Dyce/Bucksburn/Danestone is a ward represented in the Aberdeen City Council. Barney Crockett of the Labour Party, and Neil MacGregor and Gill Samarai, both of the Scottish National Party have been councillors in the ward since 2017, whilst Graeme Lawrence of the Labour Party was elected in a by-election in 2023.

Boundaries
In the Fourth Statutory Review of Electoral Arrangements, conducted by The Local Government Boundary Commission for Scotland, and published in 2006, the ward is described to contain the areas of Dyce, Aberdeen Airport and its surrounding area, Stoneywood, Bankhead, and Bucksburn.

Councillors

Election results

Elections of the 2020s
A by-election was held on 23 February 2023 after Conservative councillor Avril MacKenzie died on 1 December 2022. It was won by Labour's Graeme Lawrence, who previously represented the ward from 2012 to 2017.

Elections of the 2010s

Elections of the 2000s

Notes

References

Wards of Aberdeen